Kmet or Kmeť is a surname. It literally means "peasant", "serf", or "farmer" in several Slavic languages and "village mayor" in Bulgarian and Macedonian. Notable people with the surname include:
 Andrej Kmeť (1841–1908), Slovak botanist, ethnographer, archaeologist, and geologist
 Cole Kmet (born 1999), American football player
Frank Kmet (born 1970), American football player
 Julián Kmet (born 1977), Argentine footballer
 Matúš Kmeť (born 2000), Slovak professional footballer
 Stane Kmet (1893–??), Slovenian cross-country skier

See also